The consensus 1962 College Basketball All-American team, as determined by aggregating the results of six major All-American teams.  To earn "consensus" status, a player must win honors from a majority of the following teams: the Associated Press, the USBWA, The United Press International, the National Association of Basketball Coaches, the Newspaper Enterprise Association (NEA), and The Sporting News.  1962 was the last year that The Sporting News teams were used, although they would once again be used to determine consensus teams, starting in 1998.

1962 Consensus All-America team

Individual All-America teams

AP Honorable Mention:

 Chris Appel, USC
 Larry Armstrong, Arizona State
 Ed Bento, Loyola Marymount
 Carroll Broussard, Texas A&M
 Jay Carty, Oregon State
 Ken Charlton, Colorado
 Mel Counts, Oregon State
 Gary Daniels, The Citadel
 LeRoy Ellis, St. John's
 Dave Fedor, Florida State
 Bill Green, Colorado State
 Cornell Green, Utah State
 Jim Hadnot, Providence
 Bill Hanson, Washington
 Lyle Harger, Houston
 Jerry Harkness, Loyola–Chicago
 Walt Hazzard, UCLA
 Layton Johns, Auburn
 Bucky Keller, Virginia Tech
 Jim Kerwin, Tulane
 Clifford Luyk, Florida
 Jim McCormick, West Virginia
 Eddie Miles, Seattle
 Leland Mitchell, Mississippi State
 Mel Nowell, Ohio State
 Bud Olsen, Louisville
 Howard Pardue, Virginia Tech
 Larry Pursiful, Kentucky
 Bobby Rascoe, Western Kentucky
 Paul Silas, Creighton
 Jerry Smith, Furman
 Willie Somerset, Duquesne
 Red Stroud, Mississippi State
 Nate Thurmond, Bowling Green
 Ron Warner, Gettysburg
 Charlie Warren, Oregon
 Nick Werkman, Seton Hall
 Art Whisnant, South Carolina
 Hubie White, Villanova
 Granville Williams, Morehead State
 Mike Wroblewski, Kansas State

See also
 1961–62 NCAA University Division men's basketball season

References

NCAA Men's Basketball All-Americans
All-Americans